The head coach is Paul Flanagan. Assisting Flanagan are Erin O'Brien and Graham Thomas. The Orange finished third in the College Hockey America regular season standings. The Orange qualified for the finals of the College Hockey American women's tournament but were ousted by the Mercyhurst Lakers.

Offseason
Sept 17: Syracuse has been predicted to finish fourth in the College Hockey America Preseason Coaches’ Poll, released Sep 17 by CHA league officials.

Exhibition

Regular season
Dec. 12–13: Stefanie Marty was part of all four Orange goals in Friday’s 4–3 win over Princeton. With the Orange trailing 1–0, she tied the game with a goal. Facing a 3–1 deficit, she scored a goal and then assisted on the next two goals (both on the power-play).
February 17: Lucy Schoedel is among 45 nominees for the Patty Kazmaier Memorial Award.
Syracuse forward Stefanie Marty competed for her native Switzerland in Ice hockey at the 2010 Winter Olympics.

Standings

Roster

Schedule

Player stats

Skaters

Goaltenders

Postseason
On March 5, 2010, the Orange won the first playoff game in program history. Sophomore Lisa Mullan scored two goals, as the Orange defeated Niagara by a score of 5–3. In addition, freshman Isabel Menard added three points.
Although Syracuse lost to Mercyhurst 3–1 in the College Hockey America championship game, Orange goaltender Lucy Schoedel recorded a career-best and set a CHA Tournament record with 48 saves.

Awards and honors
 Gabrielle Beaudry, CHA Defensive Player of the Week (February 15)
 Erin Burns, CHA Rookie of the Week (November 30)
 Holly Carrie-Mattimoe, CHA Rookie of the Week (Week of January 11)
 Paul Flanagan, CHA Coach of the Year
 Stefanie Marty, CHA Offensive Player of the Week, (Week of October 12)
 Stefany Marty, CHA Offensive Player of the Week, (Week of December 13)
 Isabel Menard, CHA Rookie of the Week, (Week of October 12)
 Isabel Menard, CHA Rookie of the Week, (Week of October 19)
 Isabel Menard, CHA Rookie of the Week, (Week of November 23)
 Isabel Menard, CHA Rookie of the Week, (Week of December 7)
 Isabel Menard named Rookie of the Week  (Week of February 8)
 Isabel Menard, CHA Rookie of the Year
 Julie Rising, CHA Player of the Week, (Week of February 1)
 Lucy Schoedel, CHA Defensive Player of the Week, (Week of November 23)
 Lucy Schoedel, CHA Defensive Player of the Week, (Week of December 13)
 Lucy Schoedel, Nominee for Patty Kazmaier Memorial Award

Pre-Season All-CHA Team
G – Lucy Schoedel, (tie)

All-CHA First Team
Isabel Menard, First Team All-CHA

All-CHA Second Team
Stefanie Marty, Second Team All-CHA
Brittaney Maschmeyer, Second Team All-CHA
Gabrielle Beaudry, Second Team All-CHA
Lucy Schoedel, Second Team All-CHA

CHA All-Rookie Team
Holly Carrie-Mattimoe, F, Syracuse
Isabel Menard, F, Syracuse

CHA All-Tournament Team
Lisa Mullan
Gabrielle Beaudry
Lucy Schoedel

See also
2009–10 College Hockey America women's ice hockey season

References

External links
site

Syracuse
Syracuse Orange women's ice hockey seasons
Syracuse Orange
Syracuse Orange